Deuterocopus deltoptilus is a moth of the family Pterophoridae. It is known from Uganda.

References

Endemic fauna of Uganda
Deuterocopinae
Insects of Uganda
Moths of Africa